Higinio García Fernández (11 January 1956 – 17 December 2017) was a Spanish professional footballer who played for Valencia, Murcia, Recreativo de Huelva, Villarreal and Orihuela Deportiva, as a defender.

References

1956 births
2017 deaths
Spanish footballers
Valencia CF Mestalla footballers
Valencia CF players
Real Murcia players
Recreativo de Huelva players
Orihuela Deportiva CF footballers
La Liga players
Segunda División players
Segunda División B players
Association football defenders
Sportspeople from the Province of Cuenca
Spanish football managers
Segunda División B managers
Valencia CF Mestalla managers